Otakar Vávra (28 February 1911 – 15 September 2011) was a Czech film director, screenwriter and pedagogue.

Biography and career
Vávra attended universities in Brno and Prague, where he studied architecture. During 1929–30, while still a student, he participated in the making of a handful of documentaries and wrote movie scripts. In 1931, he produced the experimental film Světlo proniká tmou. The first movie he directed was 1937's Panenství.

His 1938 film The Merry Wives was praised in Variety for "first-rate direction, a salty yarn and elaborate production effort", even though it had undergone certain cuts because it was considered too "ribald" by American censors.

Vávra was a member of the Communist Party from 1945 to 1989. After the Communists seized power in 1948, Vávra adapted quickly to the new political climate and produced films praising the current regime and supporting the new, official interpretation of the past.

In the 1950s he filmed the "Hussite Trilogy", one of his most famous works, consisting of Jan Hus (1954), Jan Žižka (1955) and Against All (1957).

In the 1960s, Vávra made his most celebrated films Zlatá reneta (1965), Romance for Bugle (1966) and Witchhammer (1969). Romance for Bugle was entered into the 5th Moscow International Film Festival where it won the Special Silver Prize.

In the 1970s Vávra produced his "War Trilogy" consisting of semi-documentary movies Dny zrady, Sokolovo and Osvobození Prahy, all being heavily influenced by communist propaganda. The film Dny zrady (Days of Betrayal, 1973) was entered into the 8th Moscow International Film Festival where it won a Diploma. In 1979 he was a member of the jury at the 11th Moscow International Film Festival.

Since the 1950s Vávra taught film direction at Film and TV School of the Academy of Performing Arts in Prague. Among his students were several directors of the "Czech New Wave".

Awards
In 2001, he was awarded the Czech Lion for his lifelong contribution to the Czech cinema. In 2004, he received the presidential Medal of Merit.

Criticism
Vávra's critics point to his willingness to accommodate the Communist regime. In a 2003 article ("Playing the Villain", The Globe and Mail, May 15, 2003) about his documentary film, Hitler and I that he shot in Prague, David Cherniack described the following encounter with his former FAMU Head Professor:

Filmography

1931 Světlo proniká tmou
1934 Žijeme v Praze
1935 Listopad
1936 Three Men in the Snow
1936 Velbloud uchem jehly
1937 Panenství
1937 Filosofská historie
1938 Na 100%
1938 Cech panen kutnohorských
1939 Humoreska
1939 Kouzelný dům
1939 Dívka v modrém
1940 Pohádka máje
1940 Podvod s Rubensem
1940 Pacientka Dr. Hegla
1940 Maskovaná milenka
1941 Turbina
1942 Přijdu hned
1942 Okouzlená
1943 Šťastnou cestu
1945 Vlast vítá
1945 Rozina sebranec
1946 Nezbedný bakalář
1946 Cesta k barikádám
1947 Předtucha
1948 Krakatit
1949 Němá barikáda
1949 Láska
1953 Nástup
1954 Jan Hus
1955 Jan Žižka
1957 Proti všem
1958 Občan Brych
1959 První parta
1960 Srpnová neděle
1960 Policejní hodina
1961 Noční host
1962 Horoucí srdce
1965 Zlatá reneta
1967 Romance pro křídlovku
1968 Třináctá komnata
1969 Kladivo na čarodějnice
1973 Dny zrady
1974 Sokolovo
1976 Osvobození Prahy
1977 Příběh lásky a cti
1980 Temné slunce
1983 Putování Jana Ámose
1984 Komediant
1985 Veronika
1985 Oldřich a Božena
1989 Evropa tančila valčík
2003 Moje Praha

References

External links

 
 Short biography  
 DVD Cover of the Malleus Maleficarum
 Film clips from the Malleus Maleficarum
 Film clips from the Romance for Cornet
 Complete filmography 

 
1911 births
2011 deaths
People from Hradec Králové
People from the Kingdom of Bohemia
Communist Party of Czechoslovakia politicians
Czech film directors
Czech screenwriters
Male screenwriters
Film educators
Czech centenarians
Men centenarians
Recipients of Medal of Merit (Czech Republic)